Amatenango may refer to:

 Mexico:
Amatenango de la Frontera, Chiapas
Amatenango del Valle, Chiapas
Nuevo Amatenango, Chiapas